Jakes Run is a tributary of Little Muncy Creek in Lycoming County, Pennsylvania, in the United States. The stream is classified as a Coldwater Fishery. Jakes Run has no named tributaries, but it does have two unnamed tributaries.

Course
Jakes Run begins on a hill in Penn Township. It flows south-southeast for several tenths of a mile, entering a valley, before turning south-southwest for several tenths of a mile. In this reach, the stream receives a very short unnamed tributary from the left and a longer unnamed tributary from the right. It then turns south-southeast again for a few tenths of a mile, entering Moreland Township and passing near Ball Ridge. The stream then continues flowing south-southeast for more than a mile along the eastern side of Ball Ridge. Its valley eventually widens and the stream crosses Pennsylvania Route 118, reaching the end of its valley and entering the valley of Little Muncy Creek. The stream then turns south-southeast, south, and then south-southeast again, after several tenths of a mile, reaching its confluence with Little Muncy Creek.

Geography and geology

A person once applied for a permit to remove a flood-damaged culvert carrying Jakes Run and replace it with a  culvert with a stone headwall. This project was planned to impact  of Jakes Run.

Watershed and biology
The stream is entirely within the United States Geological Survey quadrangle of Hughesville. Its mouth is located near Moreland.

Jakes Run is classified as a Coldwater fishery.

History
Jakes Run was entered into the Geographic Names Information System on August 2, 1979. Its identifier in the Geographic Names Information System is 1177972.

A bridge carrying T-673 crosses Jakes Run in Penn Township. In the WATS Long Range Transportation Plan, this bridge was slated for replacement sometime between 2026 and 2033. In 2016, XTO Energy Inc. received an Erosion and Sediment Control permit for which one of the receiving streams was Jakes Run.

See also
German Run, next tributary of Little Muncy Creek going downstream
Derr Run, next tributary of Little Muncy Creek going upstream
List of rivers of Pennsylvania

References

Rivers of Lycoming County, Pennsylvania
Tributaries of Muncy Creek
Rivers of Pennsylvania